Marianne Karlsmose (born 6 June 1973) is a Danish politician who was leader of the party the Christian Democrats from 2002 to 2005 and again in 2022.

Education and career 
Karlsmose graduated from the (Fredericia Amtsgymnasium) high school in 1992. She received a master's degree in history and politics from the University of Aarhus in 2001.

She was formerly the party leader from 2002 to 2005. When she succeeded Jann Sjursen in 2002 she led an invigoration process of the party was one of the drivers for a name change of the party from the somewhat archaic name "Kristeligt Folkeparti" to the more modern "Kristendemokraterne".  At the general election in 2005, the party did not pass the general threshold of two percent of the votes and it lost its seats in the Danish parliament Folketinget.  As a consequence, Marianne Karlsmose stepped down and was succeeded by Bodil Kornbek.

After former leader of the Christian Democrats Isabella Arendt stepped down in May 2022, Karlsmose functioned as temporary leader of the party. She was officially elected in October 2022, in the midst of the 2022 general election. Karlsmose has led a campaign against former Prime Minister Lars Løkke Rasmussen of the Moderates to position herself as the center-right of Danish politics. Karlsmose supports a government over the center and wants to avoid a government with the Denmark Democrats, the New Right and the Danish People's Party.

Karlsmose stepped down from the position of leader on 7 November 2022 after a disappointing result of 0.5% of the vote in the 2022 Danish general election.

Personal life 
She is married to Birger Nielsen. They have two children. Karlsmose is also a high school teacher at the Christian High School in Ringkøbing.

References

Christian Democrats (Denmark) politicians
1973 births
Danish women in politics
Living people
Leaders of the Christian Democrats (Denmark)